Rajeevnath is a National Award-winning Malayalam film director.

Career
Rajeevnath ventured into filmmaking with a short film shot in 16mm camera after finishing his university course. He debuted as a director of feature films with Thanal (1976). The film won him the Kerala State Film Award for Best Director. The film also won M. G. Soman his only Kerala State Film Award for Best Actor. His 1988 film Kadaltheerathu, based on the short story by O. V. Vijayan was selected for Indian Panorama at the International Film Festival of India. The film, made with a minuscule budget of Rs. 600,000 ($12000 as per 2012 conversion rate) was the Indian entry for Alexandria Film Festival. The film received mixed reviews, though according to Rajeevnath, Vijayan himself was very impressed with the film. His 1992 film Aham was made with Rs. 4.6 million, despite starring Mohanlal, one of the leading actors in the industry. His much awaited Sivaji Ganesan – Mohanlal starrer Swarnachamaram was dropped after the almost completion of the film due to script changes.

In 1999, his film Janani, exploring maternity, was premiered in Oslo, Norway and won him the National Film Award for Best Direction. In 2006, he planned a biopic of Mother Teresa and reportedly considered socialite Paris Hilton for the lead role. He also suggested that his industry friends such as Mohanlal and Kamal Haasan would accept roles in the project. The news created a furore prompting him to clarify that Hilton won't be playing Mother Teresa. However, the film was never made. In 2007, he announced his plan to make a film titled Ezham Mudra (The Seventh Seal), starring Suresh Gopi and Mandira Bedi as a tribute to the romantic classic Casablanca (1942) in the backdrop of the Sri Lankan Civil War. This news too was extensively covered by foreign press, many reports wrongly referring to him as a "Bollywood director". This film also never materialised. In 2008, he teamed with Mohanlal again for Pakal Nakshatrangal (Stars of the Day Light). His latest was the Hindi film Anubhav: An Actor's Tale (2009), written by Anoop Menon who had also written Pakal Nakshatrangal.

Filmography

References

External links
 
 

Malayali people
Living people
People from Changanassery
Film directors from Kerala
Malayalam film directors
Kerala State Film Award winners
1951 births
Best Director National Film Award winners
Sainik School alumni
Hindi-language film directors
20th-century Indian film directors
21st-century Indian film directors